Ron Naclerio is an author and all time winningest coach for the PSAL league. He coaches at Benjamin Cardozo High School.

Early life
Naclerio was born in 1958. His father Emil Naclerio was a thoracic surgeon. Naclerio played baseball at St. John’s University  and later spent three years in the Chicago White Sox system. This included the Gulf Coast League White Sox.

Coaching
Naclerio started coaching in 1981. After years as an assistant under  Al Matican.  In his first season he went 1-21.  The second year he went 21-4.   By 2011 he had reached 600 wins and eventually broke the record of wins by a PSAL coach when he reached 723 passing Chuck Granby.  Eventually he reached 748 wins and counting.  During this time he won two city titles.

Author
Naclerio cowrote Swee'Pea and Other Playground Legends: Tales of Drugs, Violence and Basketball with John Valenti

Notable players
Duane Causwell
Rafer Alston
Royal Ivey

References

St. John's Red Storm baseball players
High school basketball coaches in the United States
1958 births
Minor league baseball players
American non-fiction writers
Living people